Roy Baldwin Minnett (13 June 1886 – 21 October 1955) was an Australian cricketer who played in nine Test matches from December 1911 to August 1912. He became a medical practitioner.

Life and career
Minnett was born in Sydney and attended Sydney Church of England Grammar School. He first played first-class cricket for New South Wales while he was studying medicine at Sydney University. A brilliant, sometimes impetuous batsman, fast-medium bowler and excellent fieldsman, he scored 151 in 150 minutes against Tasmania in January 1911. A year later he scored 216 not out in 197 minutes against Victoria at the Sydney Cricket Ground, adding 169 for the tenth wicket in 83 minutes with Cecil McKew. On his Test debut a few weeks earlier, also at the SCG, he had scored 90 in 111 minutes, adding 109 for the sixth wicket with Victor Trumper. He top-scored in the first innings of both the Fourth and Fifth Tests of the series, with 56 and 61 respectively.

Minnett toured England with the Australian team in 1912, but the damp conditions did not suit his play. He played in four of the six Tests, his best contribution being 4 for 34 in England's first innings at The Oval. It was his last Test match. He played a few more matches for New South Wales after the tour. In his last match, against Victoria at the Melbourne Cricket Ground in December 1914, he opened the bowling and took 8 for 50 off 24.2 overs, bowling unchanged through the innings. In January 1914 he toured Ceylon with a New South Wales team led by the Rev. E. F. Waddy, finishing at the top of the team's batting averages.

After 1914 the demands of his medical practice curtailed Minnett's cricket career. His older brothers, Leslie and Rupert, also played cricket for New South Wales.

See also
 List of New South Wales representative cricketers

References

External links
 

1886 births
1955 deaths
Australia Test cricketers
New South Wales cricketers
Australian cricketers
Cricketers from Sydney
People educated at Sydney Church of England Grammar School
Sydney Medical School alumni
20th-century Australian medical doctors